Reading Capital is a 1965 book about the philosopher Karl Marx's Das Kapital by the philosophers Louis Althusser, Étienne Balibar, and Jacques Rancière, the sociologist Roger Establet, and the critic Pierre Macherey. The book was first published in France by François Maspero. An abridged English translation was published in 1970, and an unabridged translation in 2015. The book was influential among intellectuals.

Summary

The philosopher Louis Althusser and his co-authors — the philosopher Étienne Balibar, the sociologist Roger Establet, the philosopher Jacques Rancière, and the critic Pierre Macherey — discuss Karl Marx's Das Kapital (1867–1883) and subjects such as the labor theory of value, dialectical materialism, and historical materialism. Rancière notes that his contribution builds on Althusser's For Marx (1965).

Publication history
Reading Capital was first published in French by François Maspero in 1965. An abridged French François Maspero edition followed in 1968. An abridged Italian translation was also published. An abridged English translation by Ben Brewster was published in 1970 by New Left Books. An unabridged English translation by Ben Brewster and David Fernbach was published in 2015 by Verso Books.

Reception
Together with Althusser's For Marx (1965), Reading Capital drew Althusser to the attention of French intellectuals and attracted a significant international readership. The appearance of Reading Capital and For Marx in English translation influenced the development of Marxist thought in the Anglophone world throughout the 1970s.

The Marxian economist Harry Cleaver wrote that Althusser and his co-authors provided one of the most politically influential of the philosophical reinterpretations of Das Kapital that were made by Marxists in the 1960s and 1970s. However, he considered their influence regrettable, writing that in For Marx and Reading Capital, Althusser's aim was to revitalize dialectical materialism "as an ideology to mediate the widely discredited political practices of the French Communist Party." He accused Althusser of ignoring working class struggles in favor of an abstract "science of history", and noted that Althusser himself admitted that Reading Capital largely ignored the class struggle.

William S. Lewis described Reading Capital as the culmination of the rereading of Marx that Althusser began in 1953. He considered it a theoretically sophisticated text. However, he suggested that the difficulty of the work supported the charge that Althusser aspired to "Leninist vanguardism" and wanted "a small, theoretically sophisticated cadre" to "direct the revolution", and expressed agreement with the historian Eric Hobsbawm's view that the book showed that Althusser was an "extremely selective reader of Marx."

The economist Alain Lipietz further pointed out that, while Reading Capital helped to disengage French Marxism from an oversimplification, determinism and mechanism inherited from the Stalinist period, it also obscured and censored the first chapter of Das Kapital, in which Marx analyzed the relationship of commodity and money.

See also
 Louis Althusser and the Traditions of French Marxism

References

Bibliography
Books

 
 
 
 
 
 
 

Journals

External links
 Generation Online: How to Read Marx's Capital
Liberation School: Reading Capital with Comrades

1965 non-fiction books
Books about Marxism
French non-fiction books
Marxist books
Works by Louis Althusser